Kashkabad or Koshkabad may refer to:
 Kashkabad, North Khorasan
 Koshkabad, Zanjan

See also
 Kushkabad (disambiguation)